Duggal (or Dugal) is a Punjabi Khatri surname. They are followers of Hinduism and Sikhism. A minority of Duggals converted to Islam. Mother of Guru Amar Das belonged to a Duggal Khatri family. They were mainly found in Rawalpindi and Jhelum. According to historian Baij Nath Puri, Duggal is derived from "Dourgal" who were the people that connected with a fort and its security.

The mundan ceremony of a Duggal child is performed outside the native village at the ages of 5, 7 or 9. The head must not be shaved with a razor but with a scissors.

Every year around March, whole Duggal clan get together at Hadiabad, Phagwara, for prayers at Kul Devi temple (ਜਠੇਰੇ ਦੁਗਲਾਂ). This temple is dedicated to forefathers of Duggal clan and people often visit here to pay respect and to take blessings. Temple management sends letters to the registered Duggal families for annual event.

Notable people 

Diamond Duggal (DJ Swami), British-Indian music producer, composer, sound designer and multi-instrumentalist
Kartar Duggal, Indian journalist, writer, intellectual and authority on Sikhism
Mukesh Duggal, Indian film producer who produced movies like Gopi Kishan and Saathi 
Pavan Duggal, Advocate, Supreme Court of India, New Delhi
Rajneesh Duggal, Indian model, Mr. India 2003
Rasika Dugal, Indian actress
Shefali Razdan Duggal, Indian-American political activist
Sunil Duggal, Indian entrepreneur and business executive, CEO at Dabur 
Sunita Duggal, Indian politician and MP of Sirsa
Vinod Kumar Duggal, Indian politician

References

Surnames
Indian surnames
Surnames of Indian origin
Punjabi-language surnames
Hindu surnames
Khatri clans
Khatri surnames